Eastern Island may refer to:

 An islet in Midway Atoll, US Minor Outlying Islands
 An islet in Palmyra Atoll, US Minor Outlying Islands

See also
 Easter Island, the Chilean island in the Pacific Ocean
 East Island (disambiguation)